David Herter is an American author. His first novel was Ceres Storm (2000), which was chosen as one of the top 10 science fiction books of 2000 by Amazon.com, followed by Evening's Empire in 2002. Ceres Storm is a far-future space opera, telling of a boy's quest across a solar system ravaged by a nano-plague.  Evening's Empire, set on the Oregon coast, concerns a bereaved opera composer drawn to the small town of Evening, and to mysteries that accord strangely with his current project, an adaptation of 20,000 Leagues Under the Sea.

Real-life composers figure heavily in Herter's First Republic trilogy (comprising On the Overgrown Path (2006), The Luminous Depths (2008) and One Who Disappeared).  Set in interbellum Czechoslovakia, the trilogy stars Leoš Janáček, Pavel Haas, Arnold Schoenberg and Igor Stravinsky, as well as the writer Karel Čapek and his artist-brother Josef Čapek.  The narrative employs modes of science fiction, fantasy and horror found in the works of Čapek and Franz Kafka, among others, and weaves a story that crosses and recrosses the fault lines of the short-lived Czechoslovak Republic.  Critic and author Brian Stableford says in his introduction to One Who Disappeared, "David Herter’s trilogy, to which One Who Disappeared provides a spectacular and moving conclusion, does not fall; on the contrary, it remains perfectly suspended, sturdy and elegant—and by virtue of its topography, it does not, like more myopic literary projects, taper off into soothing closure, but opens wide to an even vaster and more glorious universe of possibility."
 
October Dark, published in 2010, is a fantasia on Ray Bradbury's Something Wicked This Way Comes set in 1977 and 1931.  It tells a secret history of the fantastic film, centering on special-effects wizard Willis O'Brien's 1931 encounter with a magician whose career stretches back to the birth of the phantasmagoria in Post-Revolutionary France.

In 2012, Herter published e-book versions of Ceres Storm, On the Overgrown Path, The Luminous Depths, One Who Disappeared and October Dark, and also published a novella related to Ceres Storm called The Firebirds of Theriak.

Herter lives in Seattle, Washington, where he attended the Clarion West writing workshop.

Bibliography

Novels and novellas
Ceres Storm (Tor, 2000)
Evening's Empire (Tor, 2002)
October Dark (Earthling Publications, 2010)
The Firebirds of Theriak (Bonk-Bonk on the Head Press, 2012)

"First Republic" trilogy
On the Overgrown Path (PS Publishing, 2006)
The Luminous Depths (PS Publishing, 2008)
One Who Disappeared (PS Publishing, 2011)

Short stories
"Black and Green and Gold" 
Featured in Postrscripts 3 edited by Peter Crowther (PS Publishing, 2005)
Also featured in The Mammoth Book of Best New Horror: The Year's Best Terror Tales edited by Stephen Jones (Running Press, 2006) 
"Islands Off the Coast of Capitola, 1978"
A Tor.com Original

References and links

David Herter's blog
 Entry on David Herter in the Science Fiction Encyclopedia

Year of birth missing (living people)
Living people
American male writers
Writers from Seattle